Paul Cook (born 1956) is the former drummer for the Sex Pistols.

Paul Cook may also refer to:

 Paul Cook (author), science fiction author
 Paul Cook (baseball) (1863–1905), baseball player
 Paul Cook (footballer) (born 1967), English football manager and former player
 Paul Cook (IQ drummer), drummer for the progressive rock band IQ
 Paul Cook (politician) (born 1943), California politician
 Paul Cook (rugby league) (born 1976), rugby league footballer
 Paul M. Cook (1924–2020), American businessman, founder of Raychem
 W. Paul Cook (1880–1948), writer, printer and publisher

See also
 Paul Cooke (born 1961), drummer for Sade